The Sarasota Assassination Society, also known as the Sarasota Vigilance Committee, was a late 19th-century secret organization established by Alfred Bidwell, Dr. Leonard Andrews and Jason Alford in Manatee County, Florida. The organization, which was estimated to include twenty to twenty-two members, was purported to be a political social group or a Democratic Club. The true aims of the group were chronicled in the February 2, 1885 New York Times article; "This organization is supposed to exist for the purpose of the secret murder of political opponents, and is composed of 20 members, bound together by terrible oaths to perform the bloody work of the band and to keep its secrets inviolate."

Background 
The Sarasota Vigilance Committee actively recruited new members from the community and subsequently controlled their ranks through intimidation, fear, and coercion. Members were obligated to actively seek jury service in matters involving other members, assist in the escape of members who were incarcerated, and ultimately, murder those individuals opposed by the group. The group was organized by Alfred Bidwell and Dr. Leonard Andrews, who referred to themselves as "judges," while members Jason Alford, "captain," Louis Cato and Charles Willard, "lieutenants," constituted the remaining command structure of the organization.

Notoriety for the Sarasota Vigilance Committee came with the murders of Charles E. Abbe and Harrison T. Riley. Abbe, who was painting the hull of an upturned boat with friend, Charles Morehouse, was shot in the face with a double-barreled shotgun. Riley was ambushed while on horseback and shot in the head and body. His murderers completed their heinous act by slitting his throat. Though the murders occurred some six months apart, Riley's death was unsolved until the investigation of Charles Abbe's homicide.

In her article "He Has Carried His Life in His Hands": The Sarasota Assassination Society of 1884, Janet Snyder Matthews argues against the notion that the group had acted out of some fundamental belief that they (Sarasota Vigilance Committee) were actually defending early settlers from the excesses of land speculators. Matthews cites Karl H. Grismer's book The Story of Sarasota as the source for this theory. Contrary to Grismer's supposition, Matthews reports that the murders of Abbe and Riley were almost certainly committed to personally benefit the leadership of the Sarasota Vigilance Committee. The ultimate purpose of the organization was to plan and carry out the murders of five of Manatee County's most notable and important figures: Charles E. Abbe, Harrison T. Riley, Robert Greer, Furman Whitaker, and Stephen Goings.

In total, nine members of the Sarasota Vigilance Committee were indicted for the murders of Charles E. Abbe and Harrison T. Riley. The indictments lead to the trials of eight men, with three being sentenced to death, four receiving life sentences, and one being acquitted. Two of those sentenced to death later escaped from prison, and the remaining one had his death sentence commuted to life in prison.

Murder of Charles E. Abbe 
In 1877, Charles Elliot Abbe, his wife, Charlotte, and their two teenage daughters, Carrie and Nellie, moved to Manatee County, Florida from Chicago, Illinois. Abbe had made a handsome fortune as a salesman with the Singer Sewing Machine Company in Kansas. Having vacationed in Florida during the two previous years, Abbe became enthralled with the possibility of commercial success in Manatee County.

Between 1876 and 1878, Abbe purchased several hundred undeveloped acres from the state, as well as private land owners, in what is modern-day Sarasota. In addition to land acquisition, Abbe maintained a general store in the family's home and served as the area's first postmaster. Seeking to promote settlement in the area, Abbe often marketed Manatee County in his travels around the North, especially at local fairs and exhibitions. An active local politician and newspaper contributor, Abbe was just one of the county's 216 registered Republicans. With the marriage of their daughter Nellie to neighbor, Furman Whitaker, the Abbes were solidifying their place in the community.

As Abbe's success and fortune grew, so did the resentment and animosity felt by Alfred Bidwell and other members of the small rural community. Instances of vandalism to Abbe's properties increased in the two years before his murder. The harassment eventually turned violent with gunfire being directed at the Abbe residence while Mrs. Abbe was home alone. Mrs. Abbe also reported finding a dirk knife stuck in a table outside of her residence.

On December 27, 1884, Charles Abbe and friend, Charles Morehouse, were painting a boat on a road leading to the beach, when Charles Willard and Joseph Anderson approached them. Willard, who was wielding Anderson's double-barreled shotgun, pointed the firearm at Abbe and shot him in the face. He then turned and pointed the shotgun at Morehouse, ordering him to run for his life. Willard and Anderson dragged Abbe's lifeless body to a wharf near Bidwell's store, loaded it on a boat and dumped it in the Gulf of Mexico, some three miles off shore.

Murder of Harrison T. "Tip" Riley 
Days after the murder of Charles Abbe, a man named Henry H. Hawkins came forward to authorities with information about the uninvestigated murder of Harrison T. "Tip" Riley, as well as the structure of the Sarasota Vigilance Committee.

Early on, Judge Andrews identified Riley as a threat or nuisance to the group and gave the order to have him executed. Under threat of death if they failed, new vigilantes, "Coop" Brown and his brother, Miles, along with Tom Drymon were ordered to murder Riley. Miles Brown became ill before the murder and missed the rendezvous.

On the morning of June 30, 1884, Riley left his Myakka City settlement, en route for the post office in Sarasota. Awaiting him just off of the roadway at the intersection of present-day Proctor and Sawyer Roads were vigilantes Tom Drymon, Edmund Bacon, and Louis Cato. The trio was armed with Alfred Bidwell's double-barrel shotgun and Dr. Leonard Andrews' muzzleloader. As Riley rode past, all three fired, causing him to fall to the ground. Severely wounded from the first volley, Riley was shot several more times, but was subsequently able to pull himself up to his knees. This prompted Cato pull out his knife and dispatch Riley by cutting his throat.

Consequently, Riley's questionable reputation resulted in his murder not being investigated at the time of his death.

Manhunt and arrest 
Just hours after Abbe's murder, Sheriff A.S. "Sandy" Watson was alerted to the incident and responded expeditiously to the crime scene. Arriving after nightfall, Sheriff Watson conducted interviews with Charles Morehouse and other witnesses and subsequently performed a preliminary search of the crime scene, locating Abbe's pistol and knife at the shoreline near a prominent blood trail.

Resuming the investigation in the morning light, Sheriff Watson surveyed the bloody scene and located footprints that were subsequently identified as uniquely belonging to Edmund Bacon. Additionally, witnesses reported overhearing the misfiring blasts of a shotgun belonging to Joseph Anderson at the time of Abbe's murder. Though Abbe's body was not present, there was a significant amount of physical evidence to support the testimony of witnesses.

Warrants were issued for Charles Willard, Joseph Anderson and sons, Edmund Bacon, Alfred Bidwell, Dr. Adam Hunter, his wife Virginia Hunter, and their son, Emmett Hunter. A posse consisting of 26 men set out in search of Abbe's body and his murderers. All of the suspects were subsequently located and arrested, except for Charles Willard, who evaded capture for several days. Willard, hungry and exhausted, finally surrendered himself to a man named Sheppard at his camp in Myakka for a meal. Some of the conspirators were released and then subsequently, rearrested, in days following Abbe's murder.

In an effort to protect his captives from angry residents, Sheriff Watson was forced to transfer the prisoners from the Village of Manatee to the jail located at the county seat, Pine Level (modern day Desoto County). While en route to the jail, Alfred Bidwell unsuccessfully attempted to commit suicide by overdosing on morphine.

Trials and punishment 
The homicides and subsequent investigations resulted in the arrest of several members of the Sarasota Vigilance Committee and their family members for principals to murder or accessories before or after the fact. At the conclusion of their trials, Charles Willard and Joseph Anderson were found guilty of Murder in the First Degree and sentenced to life in prison for their roles in the murder of Charles Abbe. Edmund Bacon was acquitted for Abbe's murder, but found guilty of Murder in the First Degree, as it related to Harrison Riley. Adam Hunter was found not guilty. In their roles as accessories before the fact, Judges Alfred Bidwell and Leonard Andrews were both found guilty of Murder in the First Degree. Bacon, Bidwell, and Andrews were all sentenced to death. Tom Dryman and Louis Cato cooperated with authorities and became witnesses for the state against other members of the organization. Dryman, though convicted for his role in Riley's murder, was pardoned as a result of numerous pleas from the citizenry of Manatee County. After approximately one year of incarceration, Andrews and Bacon secured firearms and escaped from prison. Bidwell's death sentence was commuted to life in prison and he joined fellow vigilantes, Willard and Anderson, as a lease-labor convict in the labor camp in Live Oak, Florida. In 1889, Jason Alford was granted a severance from the court. Dryman's pardon prompted an outpouring of petitions on behalf of the remaining members of the Sarasota Vigilance Committee and the last inmate was released from prison in 1892.

Notes

References 
 Burnett, Gene. "The Vigilantes of Sara Sota." In Florida's Past: People and Events That Shaped the State, Volume 3, 80-83. Sarasota: Pineapple Press, 1991.
 Favorite, Merab-Michal. "Sunday Favorites: The Sarasota Assassination Society, Part 1." The Bradenton Times, August 19, 2012.
 Favorite, Merab-Michal. "Sunday Favorites: The Sarasota Assassination Society, Part 3." The Bradenton Times, September 2, 2012.
 Matthews, Janet Snyder. “He Has Carried His Life in His Hands": The "Sarasota Assassination Society" of 1884. The Florida Historical Quarterly 58, no. 1 (Jul. 1979): 1-21. 
 Matthews, Janet Snyder. Edge of Wilderness: A Settlement History of Manatee River and Sarasota Bay, 1528-1885. Tulsa: Caprine Press, 1983.
 "An Assassination Society." The New York Times, February 2, 1885.

Clandestine groups
Politics of Florida
Manatee County, Florida
Organized crime groups in the United States
Gangs in Florida

Murder in Florida
1884 murders in the United States
Assassinated American politicians
American murder victims
People murdered in Florida
Crimes in Florida
Paramilitary organizations based in the United States
1880s in Florida
Defunct organizations based in Florida